Puig Tomir is a  mountain near Lluc, situated in the Serra de Tramuntana on the Spanish island of Mallorca.

External links 
 
 

Mountains of Mallorca
Mountains of the Balearic Islands